Corey Evans (born 11 January 2001) is a New Zealand rugby union player who plays for the  in Super Rugby. His playing position is centre. He was named in the Blues squad for the 2022 Super Rugby Pacific season. He was also a member of the  2021 Bunnings NPC squad.

References

External links
itsrugby.co.uk profile

2001 births
New Zealand rugby union players
Living people
Rugby union centres
Auckland rugby union players
Blues (Super Rugby) players